Okafor's Law is a 2016 Nigerian romantic comedy drama film written, directed and produced by Omoni Oboli. The film stars Blossom Chukwujekwu, Omoni Oboli, Toyin Aimakhu, Gabriel Afolayan, Ufuoma McDermott, Richard Mofe Damijo, Tina Mba, Kemi Lala Akindoju and Ken Erics.

Plot
The film goes against the view that straight men and women can't just be friends. It brings this true by telling the story of Chucks (Blossom Chukwujekwu) nicknamed by his friends as the Terminator, an ardent player with ladies, whose quest to proving this law to his friends brings him three woman he must re-seduce: Ify (Ufuoma McDermott), Tomi (Toyin Aimakhu) and Ejiro (Omoni Oboli), whose lives have drastically changed. And this must be done within 21 days. This challenge of their various new status makes his quest to win the bet more and more insurmountable as he tries to prove the immortality of the long age law: Okafor's Law.

Cast
 Blossom Chukwujekwu as Chuks Okafor (a.k.a. Terminator)
 Toyin Aimakhu as Tomi Tijani
 Omoni Oboli as Ejiro
 Gabriel Afolayan as Chuks (a.k.a. Baptist)
 Ken Erics as Chuks (a.k.a. Fox)
 Ufuoma McDermott as Ify Omene
 Richard Mofe Damijo as Mr. Onome
 Tina Mba as Mom
 Kemi Lala Akindoju as Onome
 Mary Lazarus as Kamsi
 Halima Abubakar as Cassandra
 Yvonne Jegede as Toyin

Production
The film was shot at locations in Ikorodu, Lagos State.

Release
The film was first released on 12 September 2016 at Toronto International Film Festival, Canada. It was scheduled to be screened on 10 November 2016 at the Stockholm International Film Festival, Sweden and later in April 2017, Nigeria.

Controversy
Upon the film's release at the 2016 Toronto International Film Festival, it was accused of Intellectual property theft by Jude Idada, a writer, who claimed to be the owner of the film's story; he also claimed to have written part of the script; all without appropriate credit or remuneration.<ref>{{cite web|author=Ikenna |url=http://www.vanguardngr.com/2016/09/omoni-oboli-attack-accused-stealing-idea-okafor-law/ |title=Omoni Oboli under attack, accused of stealing idea for her 'Okafor Law - Vanguard News |publisher=Vanguardngr.com |date=2016-09-09 |accessdate=2016-12-31}}</ref> On 24 March 2017, during the premiere of the film, a court injunction was delivered, which prevented the film from being screened at the event, and also from any future screenings. However, the injunction was lifted in court on 30 March 2017, due to the lack of enough evidence to justify a suspension of the film's release. The film was allowed to open in theatres on 31 March, as originally scheduled, pending the conclusion of the court proceedings. Furthermore, it is being suggested that part of the box office earnings for Okafor's Law'' might be up for damages, if the court should rule in favour of Idada.

References

External links
 

English-language Nigerian films
2016 films
Films set in Lagos
2010s English-language films
Nigerian romantic comedy films
Nigerian romantic comedy-drama films